Devin Paul Smeltzer (born September 7, 1995) is an American professional baseball pitcher in the Miami Marlins organization. He has previously played in Major League Baseball (MLB) for the Minnesota Twins.

Amateur career
Smeltzer attended Bishop Eustace Preparatory School in Pennsauken Township, New Jersey, and played for the school's baseball team. The San Diego Padres selected him in the 33rd round of the 2014 MLB draft, but he chose to enroll at Florida Gulf Coast University to play college baseball for the Florida Gulf Coast Eagles rather than sign with the Padres. He pitched to a 1–4 win–loss record and a 6.19 earned run average (ERA) for the Eagles.

In the summer of 2015, he played collegiate summer baseball for the Hyannis Harbor Hawks of the Cape Cod Baseball League, where he was co-MVP of the league's all-star game, and tossed a nine-inning no-hitter in which he missed a perfect game by a single walk.

After one year with the Eagles, Smeltzer transferred to San Jacinto College, so that he would become eligible in the 2016 MLB draft. Smeltzer had a 9–3 record and a 1.18 ERA with 128 strikeouts in  innings pitched for San Jacinto's baseball team. He committed to transfer to Texas Tech University on a baseball scholarship after his sophomore year.

Professional career

Los Angeles Dodgers
The Los Angeles Dodgers selected Smeltzer in the fifth round of the 2016 MLB draft. He signed with the Dodgers rather than transferring to Texas Tech, and received a $500,000 signing bonus. He played for the Arizona Dodgers of the Rookie-level Arizona League after signing and went 0–2 with a 7.59 ERA in 10.2 relief innings pitched. He began the 2017 season with the Great Lakes Loons of the Class A Midwest League. In 2017, he made ten starts for Great Lakes and 15 (plus one relief appearance) for the Rancho Cucamonga Quakes of the Class A-Advanced California League. He was 7–7 with a 4.17 ERA between the two teams. Smeltzer began the 2018 season with the Tulsa Drillers of the Class AA Texas League.

Minnesota Twins
On July 31, 2018, the Dodgers traded Smeltzer to the Minnesota Twins, along with Logan Forsythe and Luke Raley, for Brian Dozier. He was assigned to the Chattanooga Lookouts of the Double-A Southern League and finished the season there. In 33 games (14 starts) between Tulsa and Chattanooga, he was 5–5 with a 4.52 ERA. He opened the 2019 season with the Pensacola Blue Wahoos of the Southern League, going 3–1 with a 0.60 ERA in 30 innings. He was promoted to the Rochester Red Wings of the Class AAA International League on May 2.

The Twins promoted Smeltzer to the major leagues on May 28, 2019. He made his major league debut the same night, allowing three hits and no runs, while striking out seven in six innings. Smeltzer finished the season with a 3.86 ERA, striking out only 18.8% of the batters he faced. In 2020, Smeltzer recorded a 2–0 record and 6.75 ERA with 15 strikeouts in 16.0 innings pitched.

On July 17, 2021, Smeltzer was placed on the 60-day injured list with left elbow inflammation. Smeltzer made one appearance for the Twins in 2021 and was outrighted off of the 40-man roster on November 19, 2021.

The Twins promoted Smeltzer back to the major leagues on May 14, 2022. On October 11, Smeltzer was sent outright to Triple-A and chose to elect free agency.

Miami Marlins
On January 24, 2023, Smeltzer signed a minor league contract with the Miami Marlins organization.

Personal life
At the age of nine, Smeltzer was diagnosed with pelvic rhabdomyosarcoma, a form of cancer. A tumor had grown against his bladder that was connected to his prostate. He was treated with surgery and chemotherapy at St. Christopher's Hospital for Children in Philadelphia. The cancer went into full remission in 2012.

References

External links

1995 births
Living people
Arizona League Dodgers players
Baseball players from New Jersey
Bishop Eustace Preparatory School alumni
Chattanooga Lookouts players
Florida Gulf Coast Eagles baseball players
Great Lakes Loons players
Hyannis Harbor Hawks players
Major League Baseball pitchers
Minnesota Twins players
Pensacola Blue Wahoos players
People from Voorhees Township, New Jersey
Rancho Cucamonga Quakes players
Rochester Red Wings players
Salt River Rafters players
San Jacinto North Gators baseball players
Sportspeople from Camden County, New Jersey
Tulsa Drillers players